Polyipnus fraseri is a species of ray-finned fish in the genus Polyipnus. It is found in the Western Pacific Ocean.

References

Sternoptychidae
Fish described in 1934